Mehikoorma Umbjärv is a lake in Estonia.

Lakes of Estonia
Räpina Parish
Lakes of Põlva County